Richard Jensen may refer to:

Academics
 Richard L. Jensen (born 1943), American Mormon historian
 Richard A. Jensen (1934–2014), American theologian
 Richard J. Jensen (born 1941), American historian

Businesspeople
 Richard Jensen (1909–1977), British co-founder of Jensen Motors
 Richard Jensen, American co-founder of Persistence Software
 Rick Jensen, publisher of The Daily Times

Characters
 Dick Jensen, fictional campaign manager in the 1964 film The Best Man
 Richard Jensen, fictional character on 1960s TV series Peyton Place

Others
 Richard Jensen (footballer) (born 1996), Finnish footballer
 Dick Jensen (1942–2006), American Hawaiian musician and born again evangelical Christian minister
 Dick Jensen, actor in the 1943 short film by the Three Stooges, Dizzy Detectives
 Rick Jensen, one of the winners in Season 2 of World Series of Blackjack